Sir John Huddleton (1517–1557) of Sawston, Cambridgeshire, was an English politician.

Family
He married Bridget Cotton, and they had one daughter and two sons.

Career
He was a Member (MP) of the Parliament of England for Cambridgeshire in October 1553, April 1554 and November 1554.

References

1517 births
1557 deaths
People from Sawston
English MPs 1553 (Mary I)
English MPs 1554
English MPs 1554–1555